Charles Tahan (born June 11, 1998) is an American actor. His notable roles include Wyatt Langmore in the Netflix original crime drama Ozark (2017–2022), the voice of Victor Frankenstein in the Disney 3D stop-motion-animated fantasy horror comedy Frankenweenie (2012), Ben Burke in the Fox dystopian mystery thriller series Wayward Pines (2015–16) and the young Jonathan Crane / Scarecrow in the Fox/DC Comics superhero drama Gotham (2014–17).

Early life
Tahan was born and raised in Glen Rock, New Jersey, where he attended Glen Rock High School. He is the middle of three children. His younger sister is actress Daisy Tahan.

Career 
Tahan played Ethan in the post-apocalyptic science fiction horror film I Am Legend (2007) and appeared in the horror film Burning Bright (2010), Tahan co-starred with Zac Efron in the drama Charlie St. Cloud (2010), based on Ben Sherwood's 2004 novel The Death and Life of Charlie St. Cloud. He also voiced Victor Frankenstein in the Disney 3D stop-motion-animated fantasy horror comedy Frankenweenie (2012), directed by Tim Burton. In 2010, he had a recurring role as Calvin Arliss in the twelfth season of the NBC police procedural drama Law & Order: Special Victims Unit.

In 2009, Tahan co-starred as William Woolf in the drama The Other Woman with Scott Cohen and Natalie Portman.

In 2015, Tahan had a recurring role in two episodes of the first season of the Fox superhero drama Gotham. He played a young Dr. Jonathan Crane. In 2017, he returned to the show early in the fourth season until the role was recast to David W. Thompson. From 2015 to 2016, he starred as Ben Burke in the Fox dystopian mystery thriller series Wayward Pines created by M. Night Shyamalan.

Starting in 2017, Tahan starred as Wyatt Langmore in the Netflix crime drama series Ozark, alongside Jason Bateman, Laura Linney, and Julia Garner. Ozark received positive reviews from critics throughout its run, with particular praise for its tone, directing, production values, and performances. The series has received a total of 45 Primetime Emmy Award nominations, including three for Outstanding Drama Series.

Filmography

Film

Television

References

External links
 
 

1998 births
American male child actors
American male film actors
Male actors from New Jersey
Living people
Glen Rock High School alumni
People from Glen Rock, New Jersey
21st-century American male actors
American male television actors